Cumbum mandal is one of the 56 mandals in Prakasam district of the Indian state of Andhra Pradesh. It is administered under Markapur revenue division and its headquarters are located at Cumbum. The mandal is bounded by Ardhaveedu, Markapur, Tarlupadu, Racherla, Bestavaripeta mandals and two rivers namely, Gundlakamma and Vemuleru rivers flows through it.

Demographics 

 census, the mandal had a population of 48,698. The total population constitute, 23,963 males and 24,735 females —a sex ratio of 1032 females per 1000 males. 5,124 children are in the age group of 0–6 years, of which 2,655 are boys and 2,469 are girls —a ratio of 930 per 1000. The average literacy rate stands at 73.04% with 31,827 literates.

Towns and villages 

 census, the mandal has 16 settlements, that includes:

Note: CT–Census Town

Sources:
Census India 2011 (sub districts)

See also 
Prakasam district

References

Mandals in Prakasam district